Commander Wilfred Albert "Biffy" Dunderdale,  (24 December 1899 – 13 November 1990) was a British spy and intelligence officer. It has been suggested that Dunderdale was used by Ian Fleming as a basis for the character of James Bond.

Life
Wilfred Dunderdale was born in Odessa, son of Richard Albert Dunderdale, a shipping magnate.

Dunderdale served in the Royal Navy (RNVR) during the First World War, despite his thick accent. he had grown up speaking Russian and English. During the Russian Civil War he was an interpreter with White Russian naval commanders in the Black Sea, once having to sit discreetly outside for a White Russian general "chatting up" the general's mistress  until he was no longer required! (neither spoke the other's language). He went to Yekaterinburg to investigate the murder of the Imperial family. He was nicknamed Biffy for his pugulistic skills.  

He worked for the British Secret Intelligence Service (MI6) between 1921 and 1959,  moving to Paris "a hotbed of White Russian intrigue", and becoming Head of Station by 1937 with the cover name Dolinoff. His work involved liaison with French intelligence (1926–40) and Polish intelligence (1940–45) in connection with the decrypting of German Enigma-enciphered messages; ; and to Constantinople, where he said that his first job for MI6 was to pay off with gold sovereigns foreign members of the Sultans' harem and arrange for them to be repatriated by the Royal Navy. 

Later moving to New York, he died there in November 1990. According to notes compiled by Stephen Dorril for his 1989 book, A Who's Who of the British State, Dunderdale was a member of Boodle's.

Notes

Further reading
 Matthew M. Aid, "'Stella Polaris' and the Secret Code Battle in Postwar Europe", Intelligence and National Security 17(3), Autumn 2002, pp 17–86.
 Gustave Bertrand, Enigma ou la plus grande énigme de la guerre 1939–1945 (Enigma:  the Greatest Enigma of the War of 1939–1945), Paris, Librairie Plon, 1973.
 Brian Cathcart, "The name's Dunderdale, Biffy Dunderdale", The Independent (London), June 23, 1996
 Kozaczuk, Władysław, Enigma:  How the German Machine Cipher Was Broken, and How It Was Read by the Allies in World War Two, edited and translated by Christopher Kasparek, Frederick, MD, University Publications of America, 1984, .
 Hugh Sebag-Montefiore, Enigma: The Battle for the Code, 2000, .
 Jacek Tebinka, "Account of the former Chief of Polish intelligence on cracking the Enigma code of 31 V 1974", p. 214 (footnote 34) in Jan Stanislaw Ciechanowski, ed. Marian Rejewski 1905–1980, Living with the Enigma secret, 1st ed, Bydgoszcz City Council, 2005, 
 Winterbotham, F.W., The Ultra Secret, New York, Dell, 1975.

External links
 Asylum.com: "Real-Life James Bond's Friends Called Him Biffy, Was Still Cool", Sep 23rd 2010 By Dan Solomon

1899 births
1990 deaths
Military personnel from Odesa
Secret Intelligence Service personnel
World War II spies for the United Kingdom
Royal Naval Volunteer Reserve personnel
Royal Naval Volunteer Reserve personnel of World War II
Companions of the Order of St Michael and St George
Members of the Order of the British Empire